Gemylus albovittatus is a species of beetle from the family Cerambycidae. The scientific name of the species was first validly published in 1960 by Breuning.

References

albovittatus